700-Fill is the only mixtape by New York City hip hop group Ratking, which consisted of rappers Wiki and Hak, and producer Sporting Life. The album was self-released on March 4, 2015 via BitTorrent and was entirely produced by Sporting Life. It features guest appearances from Remy Banks, Despot, and Princess Nokia, among others.

Background
On October 7, 2015, the music video for "Arnold Palmer" was released.

Track listing
 All songs are produced by Sporting Life

References

Further reading

External links

Official website to download mixtape

2015 mixtape albums
Ratking (group) albums